Battuda is a comune (municipality) in the Province of Pavia in the Italian region Lombardy, located about 25 km southwest of Milan and about 11 km northwest of Pavia.

Battuda borders the following municipalities: Marcignago, Rognano, Trivolzio, Trovo, Vellezzo Bellini.

References

Cities and towns in Lombardy